Scalable POWERparallel (SP) is a series of supercomputers from IBM. SP systems were part of the IBM RISC System/6000 (RS/6000) family, and were also called the RS/6000 SP. The first model, the SP1, was introduced in February 1993, and new models were introduced throughout the 1990s until the RS/6000 was succeeded by eServer pSeries in October 2000. The SP is a distributed memory system, consisting of multiple RS/6000-based nodes interconnected by an IBM-proprietary switch called the High Performance Switch (HPS). The nodes are clustered using software called PSSP, which is mainly written in Perl.

Computer scientist Marc Snir was awarded the Seymour Cray Computer Engineering Award by the Institute of Electrical and Electronics Engineers in 2013 for his contributions to supercomputing, which included his work on the SP.

Notable systems
 The Cornell Theory Center had a 512-node system that was ranked as the sixth fastest supercomputer in the world by the November 1995 edition of the Top500 List. From a peak performance of 136.19GFLOPS, it obtained 88.40GFLOPS on the LINPACK benchmark.
 Deep Blue, the first computer to win a chess game against a reigning world champion in a match with Garry Kasparov in 1996.
 ASCI Blue Pacific is a PowerPC 604-based system with a peak performance of 3.9TFLOPS. It was installed at the Lawrence Livermore National Laboratory (LLNL) in 1998 as part of the Advanced Strategic Computing Initiative (ASCI).
 ASCI White is a 512-node system with a peak performance of 12.3TFLOPS. It was installed at the LLNL in 2001 as part of ASCI, and was ranked #1 in the Top500 List from November 2000 to November 2001.
 Seaborg, at the Lawrence Berkeley National Laboratory, was ranked as the fifth fastest supercomputer in the world when it debuted in the June 2003 edition of the Top500 List. From a peak performance of 9.98TFLOPS, it obtained 7.30TFLOPS on the LINPACK benchmark.

Nodes

POWER1-based

POWER2-based

PowerPC 604-based

P2SC-based

POWER3-based

See also

 Blue Gene

References

External links
 Architectural overview

Scalable POWERparallel
Parallel computing
PowerPC computers